Season one of the 2015 edition of El Gran Show premiered on May 16, 2015.

The show returned after a year of absence, returning with the original format of dreamers instead of professional dancers. Also, the duel returned to its original format.

On August 1, 2015, model & reality TV star Melissa Loza and her dreamer Sergio Álvarez were declared the winners, actor & comedian Franco Cabrera and Pierina Neira finished second, while axé star Brenda Carvalho and Irving Figueroa finished third.

Cast

Couples
On May 16, 2015, 12 celebrities were presented in a special program for the return of the show, with the dreamers presented in first place. Mauricio Diez Canseco, one of the celebrities announced in the show, had to withdraw from the competition before it started due to an injury, so he was replaced by Sebastian Lizarzaburu.

During the show, Al Fondo Hay Sitio actress Magdyel Ugaz decided to withdraw the competition due to personal issues, being replaced since week 7 by Mayra Couto.

Hosts and judges 
Gisela Valcárcel, Aldo Díaz, Paco Bazán returned as hosts, while Gachi Rivero not returned. Morella Petrozzi, Pachi Valle Riestra and the VIP Jury returned as judges. Phillip Butters did not return as a judge, being replaced by art director Max Suffrau. At first, Carlos Cacho did not return to the show, but in the sixth week it announced his return as judge.

Scoring charts

Red numbers indicate the sentenced for each week
Green numbers indicate the best steps for each week
 the couple eliminated that week
 the couple was saved in the duel
 the couple eliminated that week but saved with a lifeguard
 the winning couple
 the runner-up couple
 the third-place couple

Average score chart
This table only counts dances scored on a 40-point scale.

Highest and lowest scoring performances
The best and worst performances in each dance according to the judges' 40-point scale are as follows:

Couples' highest and lowest scoring dances
Scores are based upon a potential 40-point maximum.

Weekly scores
Individual judges' scores in the charts below (given in parentheses) are listed in this order from left to right: Morella Petrozzi, Max Suffrau, Pachi Valle Riestra, VIP Jury.

Week 1: First Dances 
The couples danced cumbia, disco, hip-hop, merengue or salsa. This week, none couples were sentenced.
Running order

Week 2: Cumbia Night 
The couples dance cumbia.
Running order

Week 3: Salsa Night 
The couples (except those sentenced) danced salsa.
Running order

Week 4: Merengue Night 
The couples (except those sentenced) danced merengue. 
Running order

Week 5: The 90's Night 
The couples (except those sentenced) performed one unlearned dance to famous '90s songs.
Running order

Week 6: World Dances Night 
Individual judges' scores in the charts below (given in parentheses) are listed in this order from left to right: Morella Petrozzi, Max Suffrau, Pachi Valle Riestra, Carlos Cacho, VIP Jury.

The couples (except those sentenced) performed the world dances and a danceathon of salsa, where the couples danced with a different partner selected by the production, the winning couple earned two points, this added to the score obtained with their original partners.

Due to personal issues, Brenda Carvalho did not arrive in time for the danceathon, reason why Belén Estévez replaced her.
Running order

Week 7: Disco Night 
The couples (except those sentenced) danced disco and a team dance of aerodance. In the little train, only the women faced dancing strip dance.

This was the first week in which the "negative vote" was introduced, being used by judge Carlos Cacho.
Running order

Week 8: Telenovelas Night 
The couples (except those sentenced) danced adagio under the rain to famous telenovelas songs. In the versus, only two couples faced dancing reggaeton, the winner would take two extra points plus the couples who gave their support votes.

This was the second and last week in which the "negative vote" was introduced, being used by judge Max Suffrau.
Running order

Week 9: Quarterfinals 
The couples (except those sentenced) danced strip dance under the rain. In the versus, only two couples faced dancing reggaeton, the winner would take two extra points plus the couples who gave their support votes.
Running order

Week 10: Semifinals 
The couples performed one dance together with professional champions in different dance styles (except those sentenced) and cha-cha-cha.
Running order

Week 11: Finals 
Individual judges' scores in the charts below (given in parentheses) are listed in this order from left to right: Morella Petrozzi, Max Suffrau, Pachi Valle Riestra, Carlos Cacho.

On the first part, the couples danced freestyle.

On the second part, the final four couples danced quickstep.
Running order (Part 1)

Running order (Part 2)

Dance chart
The celebrities and their dreamers will dance one of these routines for each corresponding week:
 Week 1: Cumbia, disco, hip-hop, merengue or salsa (First Dances)
 Week 2: Cumbia (Cumbia Night)
 Week 3: Salsa (Salsa Night)
 Week 4: Merengue (Merengue Night)
 Week 5: One unlearned dance (The 90's Night)
 Week 6: One unlearned dance & the danceathon (World Dances Night)
 Week 7: Disco, team dances & the little train (Disco Night)
 Week 8: Adagio under the rain & the versus (Telenovelas Night)
 Week 9: Strip dance under the rain & the versus (Quarterfinals)
 Week 10: One unlearned dance & cha-cha-cha (Semifinals)
 Week 11: Freestyle & quickstep (Finals)

 Highest scoring dance
 Lowest scoring dance
 Gained bonus points for winning this dance
 Gained no bonus points for losing this dance
In Italic indicate the dances performed in the duel

Notes

References

External links 

El Gran Show
2015 Peruvian television seasons
Reality television articles with incorrect naming style